The Cole-Evans House is a historic house in Noblesville, Indiana. It was built circa 1840 for Bicknel Cole, a businessman who served in the Indiana Senate from 1836 to 1840. It was subsequently purchased by Jonathan Evans, a businessman who expanded the house in 1856. In the twentieth century, the house once again expanded in 1930, 1980, and 1993. It was designed in the Federal and Italianate architectural styles. It has been listed on the National Register of Historic Places since September 22, 2000.

References

Houses on the National Register of Historic Places in Indiana
National Register of Historic Places in Hamilton County, Indiana
Federal architecture in Indiana
Italianate architecture in Indiana
Houses completed in 1840